Donald Burton Hinkley (1922 – February 1981) was an American screenwriter. He won a Primetime Emmy Award in 1972 in the category Outstanding Writing Achievement in Variety or Music for his work on the television program The Carol Burnett Show, and was nominated for seven others for The Steve Allen Show, The Bob Newhart Show, The Carol Burnett Show, The Flip Wilson Show and The Muppet Show.

References

External links 

1921 births
1981 deaths
People from Richmond, California
Screenwriters from California
American male screenwriters
American television writers
American male television writers
20th-century American screenwriters
American emigrants to Canada
Primetime Emmy Award winners